(June 21, 1942 – August 14, 2008) was a Japanese ski jumper who competed in the early 1970s. His best finish was a bronze medal in the Individual normal hill event at the 1972 Winter Olympics in Sapporo.

Aochi attended Meiji University and then joined Snow Brand Milk Products Company. He joined the company's ski club and later stayed as a mentor to younger skiers.

Aochi died of gastric cancer.

References

 
 

1942 births
2008 deaths
Sportspeople from Hokkaido
Deaths from stomach cancer
Japanese male ski jumpers
Ski jumpers at the 1968 Winter Olympics
Ski jumpers at the 1972 Winter Olympics
Olympic ski jumpers of Japan
Olympic medalists in ski jumping
People from Otaru
Medalists at the 1972 Winter Olympics
Olympic bronze medalists for Japan
20th-century Japanese people